Haplochromis estor is a piscivorous species of cichlid endemic to Lake Victoria. This species can reach a length of  SL. This cichlid was first documented by Charles Tate Regan.

References

estor
Fish described in 1929
Fish of Lake Victoria
Taxonomy articles created by Polbot